Macedonian dialect may refer to:

 Dialects of the Macedonian language, the dialects of the modern Slavic language
 Ancient Macedonian language, is considered a dialect of ancient Greek
 Varieties of Modern Greek, spoken today in Greek Macedonia